Dahana atripennis, the black-winged dahana, is a species of moth of the subfamily Arctiinae. The species was first described by Augustus Radcliffe Grote in 1875. It is found in the US states of Florida and Georgia.

The wingspan is 33–40 mm. Adults are on wing year round in Florida.

The larvae feed on Tillandsia usneoides.

External links

Adams, James K. Images. Moths and Butterflies of Georgia and the Southeastern United States. Archived from the original February 1, 2013.

Ctenuchina
Moths described in 1875